Tall-e Mollai (also Romanized as Tall-e Mollā’ī and Toll-e Mollā’ī; also known as Qoll-e Mollā’ī) is a village in Varavi Rural District, Varavi District, Mohr County, Fars Province, Iran. At the 2006 census, its population was 38, in 9 families.

References 

Populated places in Mohr County